FANC proteins are a group of proteins associated with Fanconi anemia.

They are involved in DNA replication and damage response.

Components include:

 core protein complex (FANCA, FANCB, FANCC, FANCE, FANCF, FANCG, FANCL, FANCM)
 other: FANCD1, FANCD2, FANCI, FANCJ, FANCN, FANCP

References

DNA repair
Protein families